My Cathedral is a gospel studio album by Jim Reeves, released posthumously in 1967 on RCA Victor. It was produced by Chet Atkins.

Track listing

Charts

References 

1966 albums
Jim Reeves albums
RCA Victor albums
Albums produced by Chet Atkins
Albums produced by Bob Ferguson (musician)